The Women's downhill competition at the FIS Alpine World Ski Championships 1932 was held on 4 February.

Results

References

Women's downhill